Historia Plantarum (also called Conradi Gesneri Historia Plantarum) is an extensive botanical encyclopedia by the Swiss natural scientist, Conrad Gessner (1516 – 1565). Although compiled between 1555 and 1565, it was not published till after 1750, since he died of the plague, prior to its completion. To complete the work, he amassed a collection of some 1,500 drawings of plants, most of which were his own work. The scale and scientific rigour were unusual for the time, and Gessner was a skilled artist, producing detailed drawings of specific plant parts that illustrated their characteristics, with extensive marginal notation discussing their growth form and habitation.

Reprints
 Heinrich Zoller, Martin Steinmann (ed.): Conrad Gesner: Conradi Gesneri Historia plantarum. Gesamtausgabe. Urs-Graf-Verlag, Dietikon-Zürich 1987/1991

References

Bibliography 

 
 

Botany books
1750 books
History of botany